Adam Sisman (born 17 March 1954) is a British writer, editor and biographer. He received the National Book Critics Circle Award for his second book, Boswell's Presumptuous Task. He is a Fellow of the Royal Society of Literature and an Honorary Fellow of the University of St Andrews.

Life 
Sisman was born in London in 1954, the eldest child of David and Marjorie Sisman. He attended St Paul's School and then the University of Sussex, where he read history. After graduating, he worked in book publishing before becoming a writer. In 1979 he married Robyn Sisman, who died in 2016. They have two daughters.

Works 
 A. J. P. Taylor: A Biography (1994)
 Boswell's Presumptuous Task (1999)
 Wordsworth and Coleridge: The Friendship''' (2005)
 Hugh Trevor-Roper (2010)
 John le Carré (2015)
 The Professor and the Parson: A Story of Desire, Deceit and Defrocking (2019)As editor Dashing for the Post: Selected Letters of Patrick Leigh Fermor (2016) 
 More Dashing: Further Letters of Patrick Leigh Fermor (2018)As co-editor with Richard Davenport-Hines'''
 One Hundred Letters from Hugh Trevor-Roper'' (2013)

References

External links 
 https://www.bloomsbury.com/author/adam-sisman
 https://www.bbc.co.uk/programmes/b06kb0g8

Living people
English biographers
Alumni of the University of Sussex
Writers from London
Fellows of the Royal Society of Literature
20th-century English writers
21st-century English writers
21st-century British non-fiction writers
20th-century British non-fiction writers
1954 births